Morgan O'Hara (born 1941 in New York), is a conceptual artist based in Venice who works in performative drawing (Live Transmission) and social practice. 

She was the recipient of fellowships from the Pollock-Krasner Foundation, Gottlieb Foundation, and Artists Fellowship Inc and The Pollock-Krasner Foundation's Lee Krasner Lifetime Achievement Award, which was awarded in 2017. 

Her work is represented in public collections, including the National Gallery of Art, Washington, DC; the Hammer Museum, Los Angeles, California; the British Museum, London, UK; the Metropolitan Museum of Art, New York, NY; Kupferstichkabinett Berlin, Germany; Stedelijk Museum, Amsterdam; Cranbrook Art Museum, Detroit, Michigan; the Arkansas Arts Center, Little Rock, Arkansas; Weatherspoon Gallery, Greensboro, North Carolina; the Hood Museum of Art, Hanover, New Hampshire; the Czech National Gallery, Prague; Moravska Galerie, Brno, Czech Republic; and Macau Art Museum, Macau, China. 

Her permanent site-specific wall drawings can be found in Macau, China (2);  Kobe, Japan (9), and Amsterdam, the Netherlands. 

Publications include seven volumes of LIVE TRANSMISSION drawings.

References 

American conceptual artists
Women conceptual artists
American contemporary artists
American women performance artists
American performance artists
Feminist artists
20th-century American artists
21st-century American artists
21st-century American women artists
20th-century American women artists
1941 births
Living people
American expatriates in Italy